Smeeth is a mostly agricultural land use village and civil parish, centred  east of Ashford in the Ashford Borough of Kent, England.

Geography
Smeeth is a small village in population near Mersham Hatch Park on the A20 road from Ashford to Folkestone.

The church of St Mary the Virgin contains some Norman work such as the south doorway, tower archways and chancel. Edward Knatchbull-Hugessen, 1st Baron Brabourne is buried in the churchyard.

Three east-west routes pass quite near to the middle of the parish and are aligned east-west: the M20 motorway, the A20 single carriageway road and the High Speed 1 railway line connecting to the Channel Tunnel. Most of the development is residential and all of the neighbourhoods are north of the motorway. The parish has many headwaters to the East Stour which bounds Smeeth to its south. The far northern borders are contiguous with Brabourne Lees and link into its main 'village street' directly; this is also where most of the buffer land is woodland.

References

External links

Statistical civil parish overview - map

Villages in Kent
Villages in the Borough of Ashford
Civil parishes in Ashford, Kent